Ji Desheng (October 6, 1898 – October 18, 1981) was a Chinese herbalist from Nantong, Jiangsu, China specializing in snakebite medicine and treatment.

Early years
Ji Desheng was born as an only child in Suqian, Jiangsu, China on the outskirts of a dilapidated temple. His father, Ji Mingyang, made a living by selling traditional Chinese herbal remedy. Equipped with a unique skill but without any possessions, the family lived a life of extreme poverty and hardship.

When Ji Desheng was 6 years old, his mother died. He followed his father from morning to night; together they hiked hills to collect wild herbs, catch snakes, scorpions, centipedes and other insects to prepare snakebite medicine. When Ji Desheng turned 18 years old, Suqian County was hit by a drought so severe that the earth cracked and plague was epidemic. Ji Desheng fled the area with his father, relocating to Nanjing and the father-son duo continued to make a living by selling snakebite medicine. Ji Desheng continued to learn from his father's skills of catching snakes and treating snakebites with the medicine they made. Ji Desheng's knowledge of snakebite medicine grew with age and became an indispensable assistant to his father.

Nomadic life
During the winter of 1923, Ji Desheng relocated with his father to the town of Chahe, Rudong County, Jiangsu. His father died the following year. The 25-year-old Ji Desheng was determined to follow in his father's footsteps and continue to produce the snakebite medicine which recipe he inherited. When passed into the hands of Ji Desheng, the snakebite medicine recipe was in its sixth generation.  A forefather of the Ji family served as a snake medicine herbalist in the Qing dynasty imperial court and developed the medicine before 1795. Ji Desheng had heard from his father that every generation had made positive development on the recipe.

In order to make improvements himself, Ji Desheng tasted dozens of herbal ingredients commonly used for detoxification and pain reduction. Some of the ingredients have adverse effects when taken alone. When accidentally poisoned, Ji Desheng immediately took the antidotes taught by his father. With his intuition, experience, and repeated trials of ingredient tasting, he was able to determine the effectiveness and the performance of each herb he tried. He also courageously let snakes bite his shoulders, arms, and toes; when poisoned, he applied different medicines to the different types of wounds. Ji Desheng only applied the medicine onto his patients after testing out the medicine himself. After spending nearly 10 years of hard work, he finally achieved his long-cherished wish of producing a standardized product. The end product was produced by a crushing a variety of ingredients into powder then adding liquid to form a cake-shaped tablet 2.5 cm in diameter and 0.5 cm in thickness. The medicine also came in the shapes of pills. Each piece of the medicinal cake and pills were printed with a red Chinese character of "Ji" bearing the family name.

During the spring of 1942, Ji Desheng moved to Suzhou and successfully treated many snakebite patients. During the fall of the same year, a businessman attempted to befriend Ji Desheng by providing him money, gifts, and requesting Ji Desheng to be his mentor. Ji Desheng knew that the businessman wanted to steal his snakebite medicine recipe. Using the excuse that he needed “to gather fresh herbs from the wilderness and hills”, Ji Desheng left the city of Suzhou. Even during a time of dire poverty Ji Desheng was never motivated by quick financial gains.

In 1948 Ji Desheng moved to Nantong and continued to make a living as a street medicine vendor. There he made improvements to the family snakebite medicine. By this time, Ji Desheng was able to identify the type and gender of snakes that bit his patients from only the shape and depth of the snakebite marks. He determined that venom of winter snakes had relatively low potency, venom of snakes that just came out of theirs holes had high potency, venom of snakes during the season of spring had higher potency, and venom of pregnant snakes had the highest potency. By utilizing his theory, he was able to apply the right type and amount of medicine to cure his patients. At this time, the name of Ji Desheng and his medicine began to spread.

Under the People's Republic of China 

Viper snakes are the most common type of snake in China as they are widely distributed. They also have the highest number of snakebite victims. Ji Desheng explained the viper's general behavior patterns to better cure their bites.  He described that "during the spring the vipers began their activities; during the summer solstice to the autumnal equinox the vipers are productive and very venomous; during the morning and evening vipers are very active because the insects fly lower.” He also explained that vipers are very active before abrupt climate changes such as thunderstorms. Ji Desheng discovered that snakes are typically more active during the spring and autumn. They are active in the dark, damp areas, caves, bushes, tree holes, shrubs, and flooded areas. Ji Desheng recognized that snakes with a flat triangular head, thinner neck, bright skin color, tail short and thick tail can be the most dangerous snakes. These snakes leave the bitten area with clear fang marks that cause quick edema and threaten lives as the toxin spreads quickly.

With experience, Ji Desheng was able to go anywhere and determine snakes’ presence without seeing them.  At the same time he was also able to tell people the type of the snakes with his own special sense of smell, sharp vision, and experience. When people do not believe him, he was able to lure the snakes out of its hole by putting frog skin on his hand and whistling. He was able to lure out the female snakes by making a unique squeaky sound.

In 1955, Nantong City Health Bureau implemented the policy to centralize and improve traditional Chinese medicine. The Nantong Municipal Health Bureau visited Ji Desheng several times in order to learn more about this magical snakebite medicine.  One time, the official observed a snakebite patient from Li Gang village of Tong Zhou County, a Nantong port town. The patient swelled from the toes to the knee sat in a wheel chair while waiting for treatment. After using the snakebite cake, topical powder, and acupuncture treatment, he quickly eliminated the swelling. The patient was able to return home during the same evening. In an event that further impressed the Health Bureau officials, Ji Desheng took a toxic viper from the cage and had the snake bite his left hand. His hand quickly turned red and began to swell. Ji Desheng soaked the snakebite cake in water and applied it to the wounded area. The medicine quickly impeded the spread of the venom.

Impressed, in 1956, Nantong Municipal Health Bureau invited him to join the Nantong Ji Desheng Hospital as an out-patient specialist treating snakebites. This was a major turning point of Ji Desheng’s nomadic life. The original Ji Desheng snakebite medicine was effective but had several flaws. For instance, the original snakebite medicinal cake was easy to rot and degenerate. Also, the original dose was a black particle with a foul smell that could cause coloring of the teeth. For these reasons, the hospital set up a snakebite research group to improve the snakebite medicine. Together with the research group, Ji Desheng made adjustments to eliminate the earlier drawbacks. Respecting Ji Desheng’s contributions, the improved product was officially named Ji Desheng Snake Tablets.
By 1958, Ji Desheng had treated over 100 patients and without a single case of death, attracted the attention of the pharmaceutical industry outside Nantong. The Ministry of Science and Technology of China, with affirmation from the Ministry of Health (China), published the “Research of Ji Desheng Snake Medicine” as a major scientific and technological achievement. In August, officials invited Ji Desheng to Beijing to meet the Party and State leaders including premier Zhou En-Lai. Chinese Academy of Sciences subsequently appointed him as a Research Fellow and the Ministry of Health awarded him the "Vanguard of Medical and Health Technology", a title of high honor.

On August 28, 1960 the Ministry of Health, requested Ji Desheng go to Wuhan to treat a PLA officer. At the age of 63 and hospitalized for pleurisy, Ji Desheng accepted the request and left for Wuhan immediately. After nine hours of travel on water, land, and air, Ji Desheng arrived at 11:30pm. He immediately went to his patient regardless of his illness and fatigue. The patient had 2 bite marks on his left foot and was suffering from limb swelling, genital swelling and was at a semi-conscious state with his life at stake. Judging from the bite marks and symptoms, Ji Desheng determined that the officer was bitten by a powerful viper and had only a few more hours to live. He acted decisively to provide acupuncture to a Ba Feng pressure point, apply topical snake medicine to the ankle and knee, and had the patient intake snakebite tablets. The patient woke up from his coma after one hour.  After three days the swelling the patient’s condition improvement dramatically and he could walk slowly. After 8 days of treatment and care Ji Desheng effectively saved this man’s life. Throughout his life he saved countless number of patients like this individual.

Later life and legacy
From 1956 and 1972, Ji Desheng, as the snakebite specialist at Nantong Hospital, treated over 600 patients with the complete cure rate of 99.57%. The Jiangsu Province Snakebite Research conducted in the 1990s found that since 1973, on the basis of prescription, Ji Desheng Snake Medicine successfully treated 99.32% of the 1700 received cased.

Ji Desheng continued to personally gather ingredients of his snakebite medicine in the country, woods and hills. He led the research efforts to find cures for cataracts and cancer. Before he could reach his dream of successfully applying this magical medicine to these diseases, he died unexpectedly on October 18, 1981 at the age of 83 because of a brain hemorrhage.

Ji Desheng’s eldest son, Ji Rongsheng (Chinese: 季荣生) applied modern technologies and developed multiple topical products using the recipes passed down from Ji Desheng and ancestors.

References

External links 
 

1898 births
1981 deaths
People from Suqian
Traditional Chinese medicine practitioners
Herbalists
Physicians from Jiangsu